Inderavelly is a mandal in Adilabad district in the state of Telangana in India.

References 

Mandals in Adilabad district